Yaropolk Iziaslavich or Yaropolk Iziaslavych (died 1087) was a Kniaz (prince) during the eleventh-century in the Kievan Rus' kingdom and was the King of Rus (1076–1087). The son of Grand Prince Iziaslav I of Kiev (Kyiv) by a Polish princess named Gertruda, he is visible in papal sources by the early 1070s but largely absent in contemporary Rus sources until his father's death in 1078. During his father's exile in the 1070s, Yaropolk can be found acting on his father's behalf in an attempt to gain the favor of the German emperors and the papal court of Pope Gregory VII. His father returned to Kiev in 1077 and Yaropolk followed.

After his father's death Yaropolk was appointed Prince of Volhynia and Prince of Turov in 1078 by the new Grand Prince, his uncle Vsevolod. By 1085 Yaropolk had fallen into a state of enmity with the Grand Prince, and by extension the Grand Prince's son Vladimir Monomakh, forcing him to flee to  Poland, his mother's homeland. He returned in 1086 and made peace with Monomakh but was murdered the same year on a journey to Zvenyhorod. He was remembered in Rus sources as extremely pious and generous to the church and is recognized as a saint in the Eastern Orthodox Church.

Family background

Yaropolk was the son of Iziaslav I of Kiev (Kyiv) (died 1078), over-king of the Rus', and Gertruda, daughter of the Polish Duke-King Mieszko II Lambert (died 1034). Since the Kievan succession war of 1015–1019, the Polish ruler Bolesław had taken an interest in Ruthenia (Kievan Rus), hoping to gain control of the land of Red Ruthenia (Czerwien Grody), seized by Vladimir the Great.

Despite some initial success, the expedition of Bolesław to Kiev in 1018 failed to establish Svyatopolk Vladimirovich (Bolesław's son-in-law), Prince of Turov, on the Kievan throne. The Polish ruler did at least gain the Red Ruthenia (Czerwien Grody) very briefly, though that was recovered for the Ruthenians by Grand Prince Yaroslav and Mstislav Vladimirovich, Prince of Chernigov, in 1031.

In 1042 Grand Prince Yaroslav forced Duke Casimir of Poland to settle for a peaceful deal. Casimir recognised Ruthenian control of Red Ruthenia and returned 800 Ruthenian prisoners who had been in Polish custody since being captured two decades before by Bolesław. Peace was secured by two marriages. Casimir was married to Yaroslav's sister, while Casimir gave his own sister Gertruda to Yaroslav's son, Iziaslav.

Political turmoil
In 1054, Yaropolk became the son of the Grand Prince, as in that year Iziaslav ascended the throne of Kiev. Iziaslav's rule and thus Yaropolk's security were however quickly challenged by Iziaslav's brother Svyatoslav and by his cousin Vseslav Briacheslavich. At this time among the Rurikids, there were two senior branches that could claim the Grand Princeship through descent from Vladimir the Great; namely, the descendants of Yaroslav Vladimirovich and the descendants of Iziaslav Vladimirovich.

In 1067, Vseslav rebelled in an attempt to overthrow Iziaslav and become Grand Prince himself, claiming the right as a great-grandson of Vladimir the Great through Iziaslav Vladimirovich. Vseslav's attempt was unsuccessful, and ended in his imprisonment. Troubles for Iziaslav were to continue though. In 1068, Iziaslav's alleged negligence to the advances and incursions of the Cuman people (Polovtsy) after the defeat at the Battle of the Alta River led the citizens of Kiev to revolt; Vseslav was released, and took the Kievan throne while Iziaslav fled to Bolesław in Poland. With Polish assistance Iziaslav returned in May 1069, expelled Vseslav and retook the throne. This victory for Iziaslav secured the Kievan throne for the descendants of Yaroslav Vladimirovich, and thereafter the descendants of Iziaslav Vladimirovich confined themselves to Polotsk where they reigned with semi-independent status.

Svyatoslav and exile to the west

Despite the successful exclusion of the Polotsk Rurikids, in 1073 Iziaslav was expelled from the Kievan throne by his brothers, Svyatoslav, Prince of Chernigov, and Vsevolod, Prince of Pereyaslavl.  King Bolesław was not as willing or able to assist Iziaslav this time around, and probably for this reason Iziaslav traveled further West; at Mainz in early 1075, Iziaslav sought the aid of King Henry IV of Germany, but to no avail.

Iziaslav sent Yaropolk to Rome to request aid from Pope Gregory VII. It is likely that while there Yaropolk made complaints about Bolesław and about the money the latter had formerly seized from Iziaslav, as the pope subsequently issued a request that Bolesław return it. Pope Gregory addressed a letter to Iziaslav, called "Demetrius", "King of the Russians", and to his "queen" Gertruda. The letter noted that Yaropolk, called "Peter", had given his own as well as his father's fidelity to the pope, and that it had been requested that the "kingdom of the Ruthenians" be held of St Peter. Two papal legates were sent to Iziaslav, and Iziaslav was urged to give them his full co-operation.

It was only after Svyatoslav's death in late 1076 that Iziaslav was able to recover the status of Grand Prince. Vsevolod, who had previously fought against him, was appointed Prince of Chernigov and thus heir to the Kievan throne, explaining perhaps Vsevolod's lack of opposition. The Poles were persuaded by the papacy to give Iziaslav assistance recovering his kingdom, and on July 15, 1077, Iziaslav re-entered Kiev.

Prince Yaropolk
Yaropolk is found aiding his father and his uncle Vsevolod in 1078, when Oleg Svyatoslavich (and his brother Boris) attempted to gain the throne of Chernigov from Vsevolod. Oleg had been allied to the Polovtsy, and with their help defeated Vsevolod in battle. Grand Prince Iziaslav and Yaropolk, as well as Vsevolod's son Vladimir Monomakh, were able to reverse this result, and Oleg was forced to retreat to Tmutorokan. Grand Prince Iziaslav, Yaropolk's father, died as a result of the battle.

The Primary Chronicle records that in 1078 before the death of Iziaslav, Yaropolk was "ruling in Vyshhorod", a city north of Kiev, while his brother Svyatopolk ruled as Prince of Novgorod, and Vladimir Monomakh ruled as Prince of Smolensk. After his uncle Vsevolod had become Grand Prince, Yaropolk was given Vladimir-in-Volhynia and Turov, while Monomakh received Chernigov.

Little is known for the following eight years, but by 1085 Vsevolod and Yaropolk are reported to have become entrenched against each other. The laconic account of these developments in the Primary Chronicle makes the course of events far from transparent. Vasilko and Vladimir Rostislavich, two Galicia-based princes unhappy with territorial settlement under Vsevolod, were said to have attempted to expel Yaropolk in 1084, but Grand Prince Vsevolod's son Vladimir Monomakh drove these Rostislavchi away.

Following this, a gift made by the Grand Prince to Davyd Igorevich, which included land in Volhynia and control of trade with the Byzantine Empire, is said to have made Yaropolk hostile to the Grand Prince. By 1085 Vsevolod and Yaropolk are reported to have become entrenched against each other, and Vsevolod ordered his son, Vladimir Monomakh to march against Yaropolk. Lacking confidence in his own resources, Yaropolk fled Volhynia to Poland, leaving his followers (and mother) at Lutsk. Vladimir captured Lutsk and Yaropolk's family, attendants and treasure, and assigned his whole principality to Davyd Igorevich.

Death and legacy

In the following year Yaropolk returned and reportedly came to an agreement with Vladimir Monomakh, but nothing specific is known of the terms other than Yaropolk being reinstated. In 1087, Yaropolk was murdered. The circumstances of his murder are not clear, but the Primary Chronicle suggested the complicity of Rurik Rostislavich, Prince of Peremyshl, and his brother Vasilko Rostislavich, Prince of Terebovl. His murderer was a man called Neradets, who put a sword through Yaropolk before fleeing to hide with Rurik in Peremyshl; the date given is November 22, 1087. His body was taken to Kiev and buried in the church of St Peter, the church which Yaropolk himself had endowed.

Yaropolk is said to have married to the German noble-woman, Kunigunde, daughter of Otto, Margrave of Meissen. Whether by Kunigunde or not, Yaropolk had several children whose names have come into the record. A daughter Anastasia married her far relative Gleb Vseslavich, Prince of Minsk who was a member of the Polotsk branch of the Rurik's family. The Annalista Saxo records another daughter, and that she married Günther, Count of Schwarzburg, though it does not mention her name.  Three sons are known, namely, Yaroslav (died 1102), Viacheslav (died 1104) and Vasilko. The fate of his descendants is as mysterious as his and only has some scarce records left.

Embedded in the Primary Chronicle is a eulogy to Prince Yaropolk, and among the honors assigned to him, is that he was in the habit of assigning a "tenth part of his wealth to the Mother of God". Probably due to his personal devotion to the papacy and to St Peter, Yaropolk established a new church of St Peter at the monastery of St Demetrios in the city of Kiev. He was said to have left all his wealth to the Monastery of the Caves in Kiev. The Primary Chronicle's eulogy is the first indication of saintly regard, and indeed today he is venerated as a saint in the Eastern Orthodox Church, with his feast day falling on the reported day of his death, November 22.

Ancestry

Family
Wife – Kunigunde, daughter of Otto I
 Anastasia (daughter), married Gleb Vseslavich (Prince of Minsk)
 Volodar
 Rostislav
 Mechtild (daughter), married Günther I (House of Schwarzburg)
 Sizzo III
 Yaroslav (son) (?–1102)
 Viacheslav (son) (?–1104)
 Vasilko (son).

Notes

References
 
 
;

External links
 Laurentian Primary Chronicle, 1074–92
Vladimir the Great and his times
Holy Nobleborn Prince Yaropolk Izyaslavich
Entry in saint.ru
(English) Yaropolk Iziaslavych at Encyclopedia of Ukraine

Year of birth missing
1087 deaths
11th-century Christian saints
11th-century murdered monarchs
Belarusian saints
Princes of Turov
Princes of Vladimir-in-Volhynia
Rurik dynasty
Russian saints of the Eastern Orthodox Church
Eastern Orthodox saints from Ukraine
Eastern Orthodox monarchs
Murdered royalty